Akita Prefectural Baseball Stadium is a baseball stadium in the city of Akita, Japan. The stadium was built in 2003 and has an all-seated capacity of 25,000.  It has the nickname of 'Komachi Stadium', and it is the largest baseball park in the prefecture.

References

Baseball venues in Japan
Sports venues in Akita Prefecture
Buildings and structures in Akita (city)